Elections to Stevenage Borough Council took place on 2 May 2019. This was on the same day as other local elections across the United Kingdom. One third of the council was up for election; the seats which were last contested in 2015. The Labour Party retained control of the council, which it has held continuously since 1973.

Results summary

Ward results

Bandley Hill

Bedwell

Chells

Longmeadow

Manor

Martins Wood

Old Town

Pin Green

Roebuck

St Nicholas

Shephall

Symonds Green

Woodfield

References

2019
2019 English local elections
May 2019 events in the United Kingdom
2010s in Hertfordshire